Lake Allison was a temporary lake in the Willamette Valley of Oregon, formed periodically by the Missoula Floods from 15,000 to 13,000 BC. The lake is the main cause of the rich and fertile soil that now characterizes the Willamette Valley.

History

Willamette Valley fertility, like the Palouse silt, is in large part due to the largest freshwater flood scientifically documented in history. The ice floods started in Lake Missoula in Montana 12,000 to 15,000 years ago during the Pleistocene and flowed down through eastern Washington, bringing fertile soil to the valley as it flowed out the Columbia River Gorge. The Willamette Valley had multiple floods during the last ice age, possibly reaching 100 floods separated by centuries, to depths of 300–400 feet. If  floodwaters descended on the valley today, in Portland (elevation , only the tops of the West Hills, Mount Tabor, Rocky Butte, Kelly Butte and Mount Scott would be visible, as would the US Bancorp Tower  and the Wells Fargo Center . The lake eventually flowed out and drained, leaving  of layered sedimentary soils throughout the Tualatin, Yamhill and Willamette valleys.

Name
Geologists named the lake after Oregon State University geologist Ira S. Allison. Among other things, he was the first person to identify and correlate Willamette silt soil in 1953 with soils at the former lake bed of Lake Lewis in eastern Washington. In the 1930s he had documented hundreds of non-native boulders (also known as glacial erratics) that had been transported by the floods on icebergs and had left a ring around the lower hills surrounding the Willamette Valley. The most notable of these is the Bellevue Erratic, off Highway 18 west of McMinnville.

See also
 List of lakes in Oregon

References

External links
Missoula Floods information - Columbia River Images
Most powerful documented freshwater flood in history - Waymark

Allison
Willamette Valley
Geology of Oregon
Allison
Willamette River